The 2002 Floriade international horticultural exposition took place from April 6 to October 20, 2002, in Haarlemmermeer, Netherlands, with a theme of Contribution of Horticulture in the quality of life in the 21st century. Recognised by the  Bureau International des Expositions (BIE), the festival covered 65 hectares and had 30 participating countries.

Across the Floriade site is the Geniedijk, part of the Defence Line of Amsterdam, while the "Lake Side" was located in the Haarlemmermeer Woods. From the artificial mountain, visitors had a substantial view of the area. The Zuidtangent was opened around the same time as the Floriade, with temporary additional stops opened along the north and south entrances to the festival. The north stop is still occasionally used during events and festivals held on the site of the Floriade. The 2002 Floriade was also the site of the Spike and Suzy album, The Bright Floriade.

Gallery

References

External links
 Official website of the BIE

International horticultural exhibitions
2002 in the Netherlands
Haarlemmermeer
Festivals in the Netherlands
Garden festivals in the Netherlands
2002 festivals
Floriade (Netherlands)